A compatibility card is an expansion card for computers that allows it to have hardware emulation with another device. While compatibility cards date back at least to the Apple II family, the majority of them were made for 16-bit computers, often to maintain compatibility with the IBM PC. The most popular of these were for Macintosh systems that allowed them to emulate Windows PCs via NuBus or PCI; Apple had released several such cards themselves.

Compatibility cards by system

Apple II 
 The Z-80 SoftCard made the Apple II and Apple II Plus compatible with CP/M by way of a Zilog Z80 processor, and was followed up by the Premium SoftCard IIe for the Apple IIe.

IBM PC compatibles 
 3DO Blaster

Macintosh

By Apple 

 Apple IIe Card for the Macintosh LC family
 Houdini I PDS card for Macintosh Quadra with a 25 MHz 486 CPU
 DOS Compatibility card for Power Macintosh 6100 with a 486/66 CPU (actually a Quadra PDS card with a special adapter; if the adapter is removed, the card can be used in a Quadra)
 7-inch PCI PC Compatibility card with 5x86/100 MHz CPU
 12-inch PCI PC Compatibility card with Intel Pentium 100MHz CPU, Intel Pentium 166MHz CPU, or Cyrix 6x86 133MHz CPU (166PR) for Power Macintosh 7200, 7300, Power Macintosh 4400 and 7220

By other manufacturers 
 Dayna Communications released the MacCharlie for the Macintosh 128K and 512K
 AST Research released the Mac86 as a PDS expansion for the Macintosh SE, giving it DOS compatibility through a 10 MHz 8086 processor. It was followed up by the Mac286, which added a 286 processor through the Macintosh II's NuBus slots. After AST left the Mac market, the rights to both were sold to Orange Micro.
 Orange Micro's OrangePC series of cards were the spiritual successor to the Mac86 and Mac286. These cards provided support for 386, 486, and Pentium processors, up to a 400 MHz AMD K6-2 processor in the final model. Orange Micro also released the PCfx!, a cut down OrangePC board with a 200 MHz Pentium soldered on.
 Reply Corporation's DOS on Mac series of cards added a 486/5x86 (up to 100 MHz) processor and DOS compatibility to Centris, Quadra, Performa, and Power Macintoshes through a PDS expansion; later models supported PCI-based Power Macs and Pentium processors up to 200 MHz. This technology was acquired by Radius in 1997, who began selling the cards under the name "Detente."

Amiga 
 Amiga Sidecar for the Amiga 1000

Archimedes 

 In 1992, the company Aleph One released the 386PC, an expansion that added a 20 MHz 386SX processor to the Archimedes for running DOS applications. Licensed versions of these cards were soon made by Acorn for the A3020 and A4000; these official cards were available with both 386SX and 486SLC processors.
 An updated DOS compatibility card with a 40 MHz 486SX (underclocked to 33 MHz) was available as an upgrade for the Archimedes' successor, the Risc PC.

Notes

References 

Compatibility cards
Interoperability